The 1988 World's Strongest Man was the 11th edition (because there was no contest in 1987) of World's Strongest Man and was won by Jón Páll Sigmarsson from Iceland. It was his third title. 1980, 1981 and 1982 winner Bill Kazmaier from the United States finished second, and Jamie Reeves from the United Kingdom finished third. The contest was held at Budapest, Hungary.

Final results

References

External links
 Official site
 Youtube Link

World's Strongest
World's Strongest Man
1988 in Hungary